Ziarat Rural District may refer to:
 Ziarat Rural District (Dashtestan County)
 Ziarat Rural District (North Khorasan Province)